Envision Education is a Bay Area network of high performing charter schools, founded in June 2002 by Daniel McLaughlin and Bob Lenz, that currently runs five public middle and high Envision Schools in the San Francisco Bay Area.

Established in 2002, the mission of Envision Education is to transform the lives of students – especially those who will be the first in their families to attend college – by preparing them for success in college, career and in life.  Envision accomplishes its mission through a nationally replicated Portfolio Defense assessment model, which authentically measures the most important things students need in order to succeed in college and career: academic content, leadership skills, and deeper learning competencies such as reflection and growth mindset.  Portfolio Defense gives students, particularly those who are historically underserved, the academic, social-emotional and leadership skills they need to get into college and persist until they earn a degree.

Envision Education serves approximately 1,500 students in the San Francisco Bay Area: 70% are low-income; 94% from communities of color; and 75% first generation college bound.  From this population, 100% of graduates are accepted to 2- or 4-year colleges, with 77% accepted to 4-year institutions.  Envision graduates also persist in college once they enroll. Their college persistence rate is 87% from first to second year, compared to the national average of 74%.

Envision also operates Envision Learning Partners, a coaching and training division working with schools across the country to adapt and adopt the Portfolio Defense model.  ELP works with more than 1,000 educators in 30+ school networks and reaching more than 200,000 students.

One of the biggest problems facing underserved students is educational inequity.  Because of this inequity, poor students are far less likely to receive an education that will lift them out of poverty. Nationally, only 1 out of 10 low-income students earns a 4-year college degree by their mid-twenties, significantly limiting their income potential for their entire lives. In its schools and with its consulting partners, Envision Education strives to address this problem by giving disadvantaged students access to transformative schools where they are well prepared for future success.

Investment
The Bill & Melinda Gates Foundation helped launch the school network with a $3 million investment in 2003 to form an initial group of five charter schools. In 2006, the foundation invested another $6.9 million aimed at helping the program duplicate its arts and technology programs.

Schools

Current
 City Arts & Tech High School in San Francisco, opened in 2004 with an inaugural class of 100 freshmen. The school now has students in all four high school grades starting with the 2007-08 school year. CAT graduated its first class of Seniors in 2008.
 Envision Academy of Arts & Technology in Oakland, California, opened in 2007-08 school year with students in grades 9 and 10; today, it serves students in grades 6-7 and 9-12.  It will add 8th grade in school year 2021-22.
 Impact Academy of Arts & Technology in Hayward, California, opened for 2007-08 with 125 students in grade 9. Today, it serves over 700 students in grades 6-12.

Combined with other Envision Schools
 Marin School of Arts and Technology (MSAT), Novato, California
 Metropolitan Arts and Technology Highschool, San Francisco, California

Instructional model
The Envision Portfolio Defense (PD) model is an assessment system that prepares students for the future by authentically measuring the most important things they need: academic content, leadership skills, and deeper learning competencies such as reflection and growth mindset. In PD, students regularly curate their work into portfolios in order to defend claims about their skills , and then publicly present what they know and are able to do with the knowledge, skills, and self-awareness they have developed. PD challenges students to develop skills such as collaboration and communication along with academic competencies, and asks them to reflect on their growth and journey as scholars. They graduate with strong academic abilities, and with far more: a sense of purpose, confidence and a strong identity, and the knowledge that they are already equipped to handle future challenges.

References

External links
 Official site
 City Arts & Tech High School
 Envision Academy of Arts & Technology
 Impact Academy of Arts & Technology

High schools in San Francisco
Educational institutions established in 2002
Charter high schools in California
Charter school organizations based in California
2002 establishments in California